Brouderdorff is a commune in the Moselle department in Grand Est in northeastern France.

Toponymy 
Brouderdorff means "the village of the brothers", because it was built by four brothers.

History 
The village of Brouderdorff was created in 1616 by the Counts of Lutzelbourg.

Between 1871 and 1918 Brouderdorff was annexed by the German Empire within the Reichsland Elsaß-Lothringen. The village suffered war damage between 1914 and 1918.

Brouderdorff was again annexed by Germany between 1940 and 1944.

Population

See also
 Communes of the Moselle department

References

External links
 

Communes of Moselle (department)